Jean Cassou (9 July 1897 – 15 January 1986) was a French writer, art critic, poet, member of the French Resistance during World War II and the first Director of the Musée national d'Art moderne in Paris.

Biography 
Jean Cassou was born at Bilbao, (Spain). His father was French (with a Mexican mother) and his mother Milagros Ibañez Pacheco was from Andalucia (Spain).

His father, who had the prestigious degree Ingénieur des Arts et Manufactures, died when Jean was only sixteen. His mother gave Jean and his sister basic Spanish culture, and he learnt French and Spanish classics side by side at school. Jean did secondary studies at the Lycée Charlemagne while providing for the needs of his family, then began study for the Licence d'espagnol (Spanish) degree at the Faculty of Letters in Paris. This he followed in 1917 and 1918 by getting a master's degree at the Bayonne Lycée and, though interrupted many times, was not mobilised in World War I. He was Secretary to Pierre Louÿs, writing from 1921 to 1929 his monthly chronicle "Spanish Letters" in the cultural magazine Le Mercure de France (of which he was editor). He became in 1923 the writer for the Ministry of State Education and in 1926 published his first novel.

In 1932 Jean Cassou became an inspector of historic monuments. In 1934 he became a member of the Vigilance Committee of anti-fascist intellectuals and director from 1936 of the review Europe. In 1936 he was a member of the cabinet of Jean Zay, Minister of State Education and of the Art-schools of the Popular Front. He was then in favour of the Spanish Republic and socialism, and approached the communist party – but broke with then in 1939 at the time of the Germano-Soviet pact. On the approach of the German army, he went to the castle at Compiègne and devoted himself to the safeguard of the national heritage.

Relieved of his post in September 1940, after only several weeks, as first Chief Conservator of the Museum of Modern Art by the Vichy régime, he joined the Resistance in September 1940, writing its first leaflets. Among his friends who shared his views were Claude Aveline and Agnès Humbert and they founded the clandestine group the Groupe du musée de l'Homme, together with Boris Vildé, Anatole Lewitsky and Paul Rivet. With Claude Aveline, Agnès Humbert, Simone Martin-Chauffier and Marcel Abraham, he drafted the group's periodical called Résistance (six numbers between December 1940 and March 1941). When many members of the group were arrested, he escaped the Gestapo and took refuge at Toulouse. He was an agent of the "Bertaux group" in August 1941, and was arrested in December for his activities at the Musée de l'Homme. He was sentenced to a year in a Vichy prison, where he composed poems in his head, there being no possibility of writing anything down: his Thirty-three sonnets composed in secret were published in 1944 under the pseudonym of Jean Noir.

Freed after a year in prison, he was sent by the ST to an internment camp at Saint-Sulpice (Tarn). After a month, following a plea from the Resistance to the director of ST, he was released in June 1943 and continued his active work for the Resistance using the pseudonyms "Alain" and Fournier". He became inspector of the southern zone. The Provisional Government of the French Republic in Algeria named him in June 1944 as Commissioner of the Republic for the Toulouse Region. In August, at the time of the liberation of the town, his car met an armed German patrol: two of his companions were killed and he was left for dead. He spent three weeks in a coma. General Charles de Gaulle came to his bedside to present him with the Croix de la Libération. Though his job was replaced he kept the title, but resigned after convalescing for a year.

In 1945 Jean Cassou regained his post as Director of the National Museum of Modern Art, a post he kept until 1965. In 1971 he received the Grand prix national des Lettres and in 1983 the grand Prix de la Société des Gens de Lettres for the whole of his work. He died on 15 January 1986 and is buried in the Cimetière de Thiais, near Paris. He was a militant activist for the Peace Movement and brother-in-law of the philosopher Vladimir Jankélévitch. A bronze bust by Madeleine de Tézenas is in the Place de la Résistance in Toulouse.

Composer Henri Dutilleux set four of his poems to music between 1944 and 1956 (La Geôle, Il n'y avait que des troncs déchirés, J'ai rêvé que je vous portais entre mes bras, Eloignez-vous).

Works

Novels 
Éloge de la Folie, 1925
Les harmonies viennoises, Paris, Émile Paul, 1926
Les inconnus dans la cave, Paris, Gallimard, 1933
Les massacres de Paris, Paris, Gallimard, 1935
La clef des songes, 1928
Comme une grande image, Editions Emile-Paul frères, 1931
Le centre du monde, Paris, Le Sagittaire, 1945
Dernières pensées d'un amoureux, Paris, Albin Michel, 1962
Le voisinage des cavernes, Paris, Albin Michel, 1971

Essays 
Les nuits de Musset, Paris, Émile Paul, 1931
Grandeur et infamie de Tolstoï, Paris, Bernard Grasset, 1932
Pour la poésie, Paris, Corréa, 1935
Quarante-huit, Paris, Gallimard, 1939
La mémoire courte, Paris, Éditions de Minuit, 1954; repub. Mille et une Nuits, 2001
Parti pris, Paris, Albin Michel, 1961
La création des mondes, Paris, Éditions Ouvrières, 1971
Une vie pour la liberté, Paris, Robert Laffont, 1981

Art criticism 
Situation de l'Art Moderne, Paris, Éditions de Minuit, 1950
Panorama des Arts Plastiques contemporains, Paris, Gallimard, 1960
Jan Le Witt, by Sir Herbert Read and Jean Cassou, 1971
The Concise Encyclopedia of Symbolism. Chartwell Books, Inc., Secaucus, New Jersey, 292 pp. (1979)  (English edition, translated by Susie Sanders)

Poetry 
Trente-trois sonnets composés au secret, Paris, Éditions de Minuit, 1944; repub. Poésie/Gallimard, 1995
La rose et le vin
La folie d'Amadis

Other 
 
La vie de Philippe II. Paris. Gallimard. 1929. 12. Ed. (Orig. 1927. Vies des hommes, illustrated. No. 29 )
Panorama de la littérature espagnole contemporaine, Paris, Kra, 1929 (later edition 1931)
Tempête sur l'Espagne, Paris, L'Homme réel, 1936
La querelle du réalisme, Paris, ESI, 1936
Cervantes, Paris, ESI, 1936
Légion, Paris, Gallimard, 1939
L'heure du choix (collection), Paris, Éditions de Minuit, 1947
Le quarante-huitard, Paris, PUF, 1948
La voie libre, Paris, Flammarion, 1951

Translations and adaptations by Cassou 
L'Agonie du Christianisme, translated from an essay by Miguel de Unamuno, Paris, F. Rieder, 1925
Font au Cabres, dramatic fresco in three acts by Lope de Vega, Paris, Les Ordres de Chevalerie, 1949, with Jean Camp, lithographs by Carlos Fontsere

Translations of Cassou into English 
Chagall, 'The World of Art Library' series. Thames & Hudson, UK 1965
33 Sonnets of the Resistance and other poems, Timothy Adès, Arc Publications, UK 2002
The Madness of Amadis and other poems, Timothy Adès, Agenda Editions, UK 2009

References 

 Biography of Jean Cassou on the site of the Ordre de la Libération
Cassou, Jean, Une vie pour la liberté, Paris, Robert Laffont, 1981
Cassou, Jean, La mémoire courte, Paris, Editions Mille et Une Nuits, 2001
Humbert, Agnès (tr. Barbara Mellor), Résistance: Memoirs of Occupied France, London, Bloomsbury Publishing PLC, 2008  (American title: Resistance: A Frenchwoman's Journal of the War, Bloomsbury, USA, 2008)

People from Bilbao
1897 births
1986 deaths
French male poets
20th-century French poets
20th-century French male writers
French curators
Directors of museums in France
French art critics
French Resistance members
Companions of the Liberation
French male non-fiction writers